Chris Boot (born 27 May 1960) is a British photography curator, book publisher, and has worked in a variety of other roles related to photography. He was director of London’s Photo Co-op, director of the London and New York offices of Magnum Photos, editorial director at Phaidon Press, founder of Chris Boot Ltd. a photography book publisher, and is now executive director of Aperture Foundation. In these roles he has commissioned, edited or published a number of noteworthy photography books.

Life and work
Boot was born on 27 May 1960 in Kynnersley, Shropshire, England. He has a BA in photography from the Polytechnic of Central London, and a BA in English literature from the Royal Holloway College, University of London.

Between 1984 and 1990 Boot was director of London’s Photo Co-op (since renamed Photofusion), an independent photography resource center and gallery.

In 1990 he moved to Magnum Photos where he became director of its London and then, in 1995, of its New York office, until 1998.

He was editorial director at Phaidon Press from 1998 to 2000. While at Phaidon, he wrote and edited Magnum Stories; edited Robert Capa, the Definitive Collection by Richard Whelan and the Phaidon 55 series of books from 2001 onwards, which included volumes on Nan Goldin, Mary Ellen Mark, Shomei Tomatsu, Dorothea Lange and W. Eugene Smith and Walker Evans; and commissioned The Photobook: A History by Martin Parr and Gerry Badger, Boring Postcards from the collection of Martin Parr, Outland by Roger Ballen, Snaps by Elliott Erwitt, and Heaven and Earth by David Malin and Katherine Roucoux.

In 2001 he founded Chris Boot Ltd. in London, producing and publishing some forty photography books independently until 2011.

From January 2011 until May 2021, Boot was executive director of Aperture Foundation in New York.

Books commissioned or edited by Boot apart from those published by Chris Boot Ltd.

Chris Boot Ltd.
His company Chris Boot Ltd., a London-based photographic publishing house and exhibition producer, launched in 2001 and operated until 2011. It published Lodz Ghetto Album by Henryk Ross (2004) and Things as They Are: Photojournalism in Context Since 1955 by Mary Panzer and :fr:Christian Caujolle (2005), both of which won the ICP Infinity Award.

When Boot left in 2011 his assistant Maxwell Anderson took over management and no new projects were initiated.

Chris Boot Ltd. published the following books of photography:

References

Publishers (people) from London
British curators
Photography curators
Living people
1960 births
Publishing companies established in 2001
2001 establishments in England
Visual arts publishing companies
Book publishing companies of England
Photography companies of the United Kingdom
Businesspeople from Shropshire